is a railway station in the city of  Namerikawa, Toyama, Japan, operated by the private railway operator Toyama Chihō Railway.

Lines

Station layout 
The station has one ground-level side platform serving a single bi-directional track and a wooden station building. The station is unattended.

History
Hamakazumi Station was opened on 14 December 1935.

Adjacent stations

Surrounding area 
The station is located in a residential area.

See also
 List of railway stations in Japan

External links

 

Railway stations in Toyama Prefecture
Railway stations in Japan opened in 1935
Stations of Toyama Chihō Railway
Namerikawa, Toyama